The Margarodidae (illegitimately as Margodidae) or ground pearls are a family of scale insects within the superfamily Coccoidea. Members of the family include the Polish cochineal and Armenian cochineal (genus Porphyrophora) and the original ground pearl genus, Margarodes. Beginning in 1880, a number of distinct subfamilies were recognized, with the giant coccids (the Monophlebidae) being the first. Although Maskell proposed a new family, many continued to regard the monophlebids as a mere subfamily for many years, and the Margarodidae classification continued to be polyphyletic through the 20th Century. Since then, taking the advice of Koteja several subfamilies and tribes have been elevated into their own families such as Matsucoccidae and Xylococcidae. The pared-down family of Margarodidae (Margarodidae sensu stricto or Margarodidae s. s.) is monophyletic.

List of genera 
 Dimargarodes Silvestri, 1938
 Eumargarodes Jakubski, 1950
 Eurhizococcus Silvestri, 1936
 Heteromargarodes Jakubski, 1965
 Margarodes Guilding, 1828
 Margarodesia Foldi, 1981
 Neomargarodes Green, 1914
 Porphyrophora Brandt, 1833
 Promargarodes Silvestri, 1938
 Termitococcus Silvestri, 1901

Former genera
 Crypticerya Cockerell, 1895 now in the Monophlebidae
 Desmococcus McKenzie, 1942 now in the Pityococcidae
 Drosicha Walker, 1858 now in the Monophlebidae
 Gueriniella Fernald, 1903 now in the Monophlebidae
 Icerya Signoret, 1875 now in the Monophlebidae
 Kuwania Cockerell in Fernald, 1903 now in the Kuwaniidae
 Marchalina Vayssiere, 1923 now in the Marchalinidae
 Matsucoccus Cockerell, 1909 now in the Matsucoccidae
 Palaeococcus Cockerell, 1894 now in the Monophlebidae
 Steingelia Nassonov, 1908 now in the Steingeliidae
 Xylococcus Löw, 1883 now in the Xylococcidae

See also
 Callipappidae, former subfamily of the Margarodidae
 Coelostomidiidae, former subfamily of the Margarodidae

References

External links
 Margarodes spp., ground pearls on the UF / IFAS  Featured Creatures Web site

 
Scale insects
Hemiptera families
Archaeococcoids